Sf9 cells, a clonal isolate of Spodoptera frugiperda Sf21 cells (IPLB-Sf21-AE), are commonly used in insect cell culture for recombinant protein production using baculovirus. They were originally established from ovarian tissue. They can be grown in the absence of serum, and can be cultured attached or in suspension.

Sf9 Rhabdovirus 
It has previously been shown that some Sf9 cell lines harbor a negative sense Rhabdovirus called Spodoptera frugiperda rhabdovirus (SfRV). However, not all tested Sf9 cells appear to be infected with this virus. SfRV appears to be insect-specific and does not appear to infect mammalian cell lines.

References

External links
Cellosaurus entry for Sf9

Insect cell lines
Spodoptera